Raccordo autostradale RA4 is a motorway that connects the Autostrada A2 with Strada statale 106 Jonica through the city of Reggio Calabria. The motorway junction also constitutes the central section of the so-called Reggio Calabria ring road.

References 

RA04
Transport in Calabria